Faruk Nafız Özak (born 19 April 1946) is a Turkish politician and a former Minister of Public Works and Housing (2005–2009) and Minister of State (for Youth and Sports) (2009–2011) under Prime Minister Recep Tayyip Erdoğan.

Özak was born in Trabzon, and graduated from the Civil Engineering Department of Karadeniz Technical University. He was the captain of the prominent Turkish football club Trabzonspor, and once sportsman of the year. He became chairman of the club in 1996. He was elected as an MP from Trabzon in 2009, holding the combined office of Minister of State and Minister of Youth and Sports, before the dissolution of the Minister of State position and the establishment of Ministry of Youth and Sports in 2011. He is married with two children.

References 

Living people
1946 births
Turkish footballers
Trabzonspor footballers
Deputies of Trabzon
Government ministers of Turkey
People from Trabzon
Ministers of Youth and Sports of Turkey
Ministers of Public Works of Turkey
Members of the 24th Parliament of Turkey
Members of the 23rd Parliament of Turkey
Members of the 22nd Parliament of Turkey
Ministers of State of Turkey
Members of the 60th government of Turkey
Association footballers not categorized by position